Gabriel Green (November 11, 1924 – September 8, 2001) was an American early UFOlogist who claimed contact with extraterrestrials. Green was a write-in United States presidential candidate in 1960 and 1972.

Biography 
Green claimed to have graduated with a PhD in physics from UC Berkeley in 1953, and to have made several important contributions to the Standard Model of elementary particles, but Berkeley has no record of his attendance, and his actual educational background seems to have been acquired at Woodbury Business College in Los Angeles. For much of his life he worked as a photographer for the Los Angeles school system. Green is among the well-known 1950s UFO contactees –  individuals who claimed to have met and talked with friendly humanoid Space Brothers from other worlds, and to have ridden in their spacecraft, or visited their planets.

He founded the California-based Amalgamated Flying Saucer Clubs of America, Inc. in 1957, approximately at the same time he announced he had had a meeting with flying saucer crewmen from the hitherto unknown planet Korendor, orbiting the triple star Alpha Centauri. It has also been claimed that Korendor is orbiting the star Korena. Like George Adamski and several other contactees of the period, he said he was able to maintain continual telepathic links with the  wise and helpful extraterrestrials he had met. In his 1960 run for US president, he claimed to represent the Universal Flying Saucer Party, and to base his political philosophy on "United World Universal Economics." He also ran unsuccessfully for the U.S. Senate in 1962 in California, claiming to have accumulated over 171,000 votes.

In 1967 he published his only book, Let's Face Facts about Flying Saucers. In 1972 he ran again, this time in Iowa, for US president, collecting less than 200 votes. Like most, if not all of the 1950s contactees, Green was evidently far more interested in New Age and Theosophical topics such as reincarnation, channelling, Spiritualism and psychic phenomena than he was in being a prophet expounding wisdom supposedly acquired from friendly space-alien contacts. Again, like most of the other contactees, he eventually dropped out of sight, moving to the vicinity of Yucca Valley, California after his last run for president. Thereafter, little was heard of him until his death in September, 2001.

References

Source 3 Does Not support the statement made.  The source cited originates almost entirely from Bob Renaud.  Gabriel Green was not having his own contacts in the 1950s.

External links
 Ron Schuler's Parlour Tricks: 'Let's Face Facts About Flying Saucers'
Articles about Gabriel Green in the Los Angeles Times from 1960:

Louize, Lucus. The George Adamski and Howard Menger Series: The Truth About the Galaxy: A Brief Summary Also The Kors of the Alliance Are Our Friends (The Alliance Is A Different Group From The Confederation) And How Anyone Can Contact the Real Galactic Confederation (2019)

1924 births
2001 deaths
Contactees
California politicians
People from Whittier, California
Ufologists
Candidates in the 1960 United States presidential election
Candidates in the 1972 United States presidential election
20th-century American politicians
Woodbury University alumni